Livernois may refer to:
 The Livernois-Fenkell riot, a disturbance in Detroit (1975)
 Livernois Avenue, a street in Detroit
 Charles Benoit Livernois (1755-1840), Canadian politician
 Jules-Isaïe Benoît (1830-1865), Canadian photographer who went by the name "Livernois"